Strictispira ericana is a species of small sea snail, a marine gastropod mollusk in the family Pseudomelatomidae, the turrids and allies.

Description
The length of the shell attains 12 mm.

Distribution
This species occurs in the Sea of Cortez, Western Mexico.

References

 Hertlein, L.G. & Strong, A.M. (1951) Eastern Pacific expeditions of the New York Zoological Society. XLIII. Mollusks from the west coast of Mexico and Central America. Part X. Zoologica, 36, 67–120.

External links
 
 Gastropods.com: Strictispira ericana

ericana
Gastropods described in 1951